Joseph W. Hand (July 29, 1845 – February 15, 1929), was an early pioneer businessman, real estate agent, leader in civic affairs, actor, and first president of the Forest Theater in Carmel-by-the-Sea.

Early life 

Hand was born on July 29, 1845, in Lynn, Massachusetts. His father was Steward Gardiner Hand (1812-1863) and his mother was Mary Elizabeth Edwards (1920-1880). In 1861, at age sixteen, he came out west as a Pony Express rider on a branch line that ran from Virginia City, Nevada to Humboldt County, California. He had one daughter with Elizabeth E. Hand (1846-). He also had one daughter with Adeline C. Graham (1850-1871), whom he married on June 11, 1868. She died on February 7, 1871. Hand then married Mary E. Dickson (1856-1927) in San Francisco on April 26, 1874 by the Rev. Mr. Lathrop, and had six children together.

Professional background

Hand, also known as Joe Hand, was in the grocery trade in Oakland, California. After the 1906 San Francisco earthquake, he and his family left San Francisco and moved to Carmel-by-the-Sea, California. He was a bookkeeper for the Carmel Development Company for six years. He then went into the real estate and insurance business. He was also the city recorder of Carmel for many years.

Mary E. Hand

Hand and his wife, Mary E. Hand, were both active in civic and social life. In 1908, Mary helped organize and became president of Carmel Arts and Crafts Club. On April 16, 1919, under the direction of Mary Hand, civic leader and attorney Argyll Campbell was in the play, A Night Off, where he played Justinian Babbitt, Professor of Ancient History. She worked with playwright John Northern Hilliard to build the Carmel Arts and Crafts Theater in 1922, where the Club put on their own theatrical productions. The formal opening of the theater was highlighted by the performance of two plays produced and directed by Hilliard, The Thrice Promised Bride and The Queen's Enemies. She led the group for sixteen years. They both helped with the "International Dutch Market" and with Carmel's first public library.

Joseph Hand appeared in the marching band of the 1909 Dutch Festival where they paraded down Ocean Avenue. In 1923, at another fundraiser for the Club,  Perry Newberry was a one-man band, Joseph Hand was Buffalo Bill, and others played in a circus tent at the Devendorf Park.

On April 26, 1924, Mr. and Mrs. Hand celebrated their fiftieth wedding anniversary in San Francisco, assisted by forty-eight relatives, including ten grandchildren, and two great-grandchildren.

On January 23, 1926, Mary E. Hand and her husband transferred a real estate deed to Lot 6 and east 25 feet lot 10, Blk. 72 in Carmel to William P. Fee, for $10. Fee built the Fee Building in 1935 in Carmel.

Forest Theater

Hand founded Carmel's first dramatic club and was the first president of the Forest Theater, that was organized in 1910. He played the part of Hushai in the opening play David and Saul, produced by Constance Skinner, a biblical drama under the direction of Garnet Holme of Berkeley, at the annual production at the Forest Theater in Carmel on July 9, 1910. Helen Cooke played the character Michel.

In July 1912, Hand was in the Forest Theatre play The Toad, a drama of ancient Egypt, by Bertha Newberry, wife of Perry Newberry, produced by Garnet Holme. Perry Newberry played the Toad, the king's Dwarf; John T. Gribner as Ahmes, the King's scheming brother; Hand played Tinro, the inspector of the walls; artist Mary DeNeale Morgan played Arbela; Daisy Fox Desmond played an Egyptian dancer, Helen Cooke Wilson as Cleis, Seeress of Amon; and Xavier Martínez as the third assassin.

On August 7, 1915, at age 70, Hand had his "farewell" appearance and leading part in the play ‘’The Man From Home,’’ written by Harry Leon Wilson and Booth Tarkington, that appeared at the Forest Theater and was produced by Glenn Hughes for the Carmel Arts and Crafts Club. Wilson helped supervise the play and was in the audience on the night of the opening. Characters in the play included Hand as Daniel Voorhees Pike, John Selby as Hanna; Katherine Wood as Ethel Granger Simpson; and J. Edward Pawson as the Hon. Almerce St. Aubyn.

Hand did not retire from acting after his successful performance in The Man From Home. He returned to the stage to appear in the July 1917 performance of Androcles and the Lion by George Bernard Shaw, a Carmel Arts and Crafts Play with Perry Newberry as the producer. The play included the characters Hand as Julius Caesar, Katharine Cooke as Lavinia, Ernest Schweninger as the captain and others. That same month he appeared in the play  by Percy MacKaye and the Forest Theatre Society. Perry Newberry was the producer. Hand play one of the Lords of the Royal Divan, along with Schweninger, Cooke.

Hand's last performance was at the Forest Theater in 1928, when he took a small part in the play The Taming of the Shrew, a comedy by William Shakespeare. Garnet Holme was the producer.

Death
Hand's wife, Mary E. Hand, died in 1927.

Joseph Hand died, two tears later, on February 15, 1929, in Alameda, California, at the age of 83. Services were held at the Ward home with Dr. Frank S. Brush officiated. He was a member of the Abalone Club and the local Elks lodge, which was in charge of the service.

See also
 Timeline of Carmel-by-the-Sea, California
 Forest Theater

References

External links

 Biography of Joseph W. Hand of Carmel California

1845 births
1929 deaths
People from Carmel-by-the-Sea, California
People from Alameda, California